The 1st Guards Zvenigorod–Bucharest Red Banner Order of Suvorov Airborne Division (Russian: 1-я гвардейская воздушно-десантная Звенигородско-Бухарестская Краснознамённая ордена Суворова дивизия) was a division of the Soviet Airborne Troops. The division was first formed in December 1942 and fought in the Battle of the Dnieper, the Battle of the Korsun–Cherkassy Pocket, the Uman–Botoșani offensive, the second Jassy–Kishinev offensive, the Battle of Debrecen, the siege of Budapest and the Prague offensive. In August 1945 it was sent east and fought in the Soviet invasion of Manchuria. The division became the 124th Guards Rifle Division in November 1945 and disbanded in 1956.

History 
The division was formed in accordance with an order from 8 December 1942 from the 4th Airborne Corps headquarters and the 1st Airborne Brigade.

The division became part of the Special Group commanded by Mikhail Khozin. In mid-February 1943, it was concentrated south of Zaluceni. Its objective was to advance into a breach in the German lines in the 1st Shock Army offensive zone. In March, the division fought in the Staraya Russa operation, but was unable to capture the town. In August, it made another attempt and cut the Staraya Russa-Kholm road on 18 August. It then advanced to the Porus River at the villages of Chirikov and Kotov. The division entrenched in positions there. After the end of the fighting, it was sent to the rear to rest and refit; in September, it was transferred to the Steppe Front.

It fought in the capture of Left-bank Ukraine in the area east of  Kremenchug. On 9 October, it crossed the Dnieper near Moldavan Island and the villages of Soloshino and Perevolochna. October 9, 1943, crossed the Dnieper near the island of Moldovans, Soloshino, Perevolochna, advancing in the second echelon of the 37th Army. From October to December, the division advanced towards Krivoy Rog and Kirovograd.

In January and February 1944, the division fought in the Korsun–Shevchenkovsky offensive and took part in the encirclement of German troops around Zvenigorod. The division was awarded the honorific "Zvenigorod" for its actions during the fighting on 13 February. Between March and April, it fought in the Uman–Botoșani offensive. During the offensive, the division reached the Dniester and Dubăsari. During the summer it fought in the second Jassy–Kishinev offensive. During the offensive, it advanced in the second echelon of 53rd Army towards Focșani. On 31 August, it entered Bucharest. At the end of September, the division reached the Hungarian border northwest of Arad. On 6 October, it launched an offensive from there during the Battle of Debrecen and reached the Tisza. The division crossed the Tisza in November during the Budapest offensive.

By February 1945, the division was positioned on the Hron. It fought in the Bratislava–Brno offensive in April and the Prague offensive in May. During June and July, the division was transferred to Choibalsan in Mongolia, along with the 53rd Army. It became part of the 18th Guards Rifle Corps. In August 1945, it fought in the Khingan–Mukden offensive operation, part of the Soviet invasion of Manchuria. At the end of the war, it was in Tongliao, where the division conducted its first airborne operation.

On 5 December 1945 the division became the 124th Guards Rifle Division, still with the 18th Guards Rifle Corps in the East Siberian Military District.  The division relocated to Nizhneudinsk, Irkutsk Oblast in the spring of 1946. It became the 20th Separate Guards Rifle Brigade there and was directly subordinated to the district as a result of postwar troop reductions. In October 1953 it was upgraded to a division again. The East Siberian Military District became the 31st Rifle Corps of the Transbaikal Military District around this time. The division thus became part of the 31st Rifle Corps. On 4 April 1956, the division was disbanded.

Composition
The 1st Guards Airborne Division included the following units. 
3rd Guards Airborne Regiment (formed from 8th Airborne Brigade)
6th Guards Airborne Regiment (formed from 9th Airborne Brigade)
13th Guards Airborne Regiment (formed from 214th Airborne Brigade)
4th Guards Airborne Artillery Regiment
2nd Guards Airborne Antitank Battalion 
5th Separate Guards Airborne Reconnaissance Company
11th Field Bakery
13th Veterinary Hospital
2464th Field Post Office

Subordination

Notes

References 
 
Robert G. Poirier and Albert Z. Conner, The Red Army Order of Battle in the Great Patriotic War, Novato: Presidio Press, 1985. .

Further reading 

V. N. Nechayev. 50th Guards Tank Brigade/B. S. Lebedev. 1st Guards Airborne Division- Saratov: Приволж. кн. изд-во, 1991. – 200 с.
I. I. Gromov, V. N. Pigunov, V. N. Piskunov. Forward, Airborne Raiders, to the Victory. Под общ. ред. проф. Г. И. Шпака. – М.: ПОЛИФОРМ, 2010. – 440 с.: ил.

001
Military units and formations established in 1942
Military units and formations disestablished in 1956
Military units and formations awarded the Order of the Red Banner